Berrys Bay is a bay located to the east of the Waverton Peninsula and the west of McMahons Point, on the north of Sydney Harbour.

A number of ship building firms operate from the bay.

History
In 2008 the Government of New South Wales called for Expressions of Interest for the private sector to develop a maritime precinct at Berrys Bay. In 2013 Roads & Maritime Services and Government Property NSW entered into an agreement to lease with Pacifica Developments (formerly known as Meridien Marinas) to develop a maritime precinct at this site. No later information is available on this project.

In March 2021 Transport for NSW appointed a Berrys Bay Community and Stakeholder Working Group to help shape a fresh vision for this historic Waverton harbourside location. The group was scheduled to meet for the first time in April. In February 2022 ownership of the Qurantine Depot site passed to North Sydney Council.

References

Bays of New South Wales
Sydney Harbour